Klinik am Alex is a German television series.

Klinik am Alex was the title of a television series by Sat.1. The series dealt with the medical staff of a clinic on Berlin's Alexanderplatz . The series was produced by teamWorx in the former building of the Heckeshorn lung clinic in Berlin-Wannsee. The international trade center (IHZ) on Friedrichstrasse served as the facade of the clinic.

Since the ratings were below the channel average of Sat.1, the program with episode five was discontinued on February 26, 2009. The series returned on March 10, 2012 beginning with episode one in the program of Sat.1. However, the series only reached 1.11 million viewers, which corresponded to a market share of 4.4%. From the sixth episode, the episodes were broadcast on Sundays at 7:00 a.m. as the first German broadcast. From the twelfth episode, the remaining episodes were broadcast on the pay TV channel Sat.1 emotions.

See also
List of German television series

External links
 

German medical television series
Television shows set in Berlin
2009 German television series debuts
2009 German television series endings
German-language television shows
Sat.1 original programming